The 2014 Challenger Banque Nationale de Saguenay was a professional tennis tournament played on indoor hard courts. It was the 9th edition of the tournament and part of the 2014 ITF Women's Circuit, offering a total of $50,000 in prize money. It took place in Saguenay, Quebec, Canada between October 20 and October 26, 2014.

Singles main-draw entrants

Seeds

1 Rankings are as of October 13, 2014

Other entrants
The following players received wildcards into the singles main draw:
 Petra Januskova
 Marie-Alexandre Leduc
 Maria Patrascu
 Charlotte Robillard-Millette

The following players received entry from the qualifying draw:
 Ayan Broomfield
 Nadja Gilchrist
 Kim Grajdek
 Rosie Johanson

The following player received entry as a lucky loser:
 Lauren Albanese

Champions

Singles

 Julie Coin def.  Jovana Jakšić, 7–5, 6–3

Doubles

 Ysaline Bonaventure /  Nicola Slater def.  Sonja Molnar /  Caitlin Whoriskey, 6–4, 6–4

External links
Official website

Challenger Banque Nationale de Saguenay
Challenger de Saguenay
Challenger Banque Nationale de Saguenay